The Rodrigues giant day gecko (Phelsuma gigas) is an extinct species of day gecko. It lived on the island of Rodrigues and surrounding islands and typically dwelt on trees. The Rodrigues giant day gecko fed on insects and nectar, and, unlike most other day geckos, was apparently nocturnal in habit.

Description

Phelsuma gigas was one of the largest known geckoes. The body colour was grayish or grayish brown. On the back there were irregular black spottings. The tail had some striping and was charcoal- or dark grey-coloured. The tongue had a pink colour and the ventral side of the body was light yellow. The original collected specimens that were used to describe this species have been lost. Today, only a few portions of some skeletons remain.

Behaviour
Leguat described the species:

Distribution
This species inhabited Rodrigues and surrounding islands. P. gigas was last collected in 1842 on the offshore islet of Ile aux Fregates.

Habitat
P. gigas was an arboreal lizard living on trees within the forests of Rodrigues.  P. gigas became extinct due to human-induced deforestation and predation by introduced cats and rats.

Diet
These day geckos fed on various insects and other invertebrates.  As observed in other species of day geckos, it was assumed that P. gigas also liked to lick at soft, sweet fruit, pollen and nectar.

References

 Günther (1877) Journal of the Linnean Society, Zoology, 13:322-327
 Liénard (1842) Rapport de la Société d'Histoire Naturelle de Maurice, (13):55-57
 McKeown, Sean (1993) The general care and maintenance of day geckos. Advanced Vivarium Systems, Lakeside CA.
  Database entry includes a brief justification of why this species is listed as extinct

Extinct reptiles
Reptile extinctions since 1500
Phelsuma
Reptiles described in 1842